Roy Jay Glauber (September 1, 1925 – December 26, 2018) was an American theoretical physicist. He was the Mallinckrodt Professor of Physics at Harvard University and Adjunct Professor of Optical Sciences at the University of Arizona. Born in New York City, he was awarded one half of the 2005 Nobel Prize in Physics "for his contribution to the quantum theory of optical coherence", with the other half shared by John L. Hall and Theodor W. Hänsch. In this work, published in 1963, he created a model for photodetection and explained the fundamental characteristics of different types of light, such as laser light (see coherent state) and light from light bulbs (see blackbody). His theories are widely used in the field of quantum optics. In statistical physics he pioneered the study of the dynamics of first-order phase transitions, since he first defined and investigated the stochastic dynamics of an Ising model in a largely influential paper published in 1963.  
He served on the National Advisory Board of the Center for Arms Control and Non-Proliferation, the research arms of Council for a Livable World.

Education
Glauber was born in 1925 in New York City, the son of Felicia (Fox) and Emanuel B. Glauber. He was a member of the 1941 graduating class of the Bronx High School of Science, the first graduating class from that school.  He then went on to do his undergraduate work at Harvard University. After his sophomore year he was recruited to work on the Manhattan Project, where (at the age of 18) he was one of the youngest scientists at Los Alamos National Laboratory. His work involved calculating the critical mass for the atom bomb. After two years at Los Alamos, he returned to Harvard, receiving his bachelor's degree in 1946 and his PhD in 1949.

Research
Glauber's recent research dealt with problems in a number of areas of quantum optics, a field which, broadly speaking, studies the quantum electrodynamical interactions of light and matter. He also continued work on several topics in high-energy collision theory, including the analysis of hadron collisions, and the statistical correlation of particles produced in high-energy reactions.

Specific topics of his research included: the quantum mechanical behavior of trapped wave packets; interactions of light with trapped ions; atom counting-the statistical properties of free atom beams and their measurement; algebraic methods for dealing with fermion statistics; coherence and correlations of bosonic atoms near the Bose–Einstein condensation; the theory of continuously monitored photon counting-and its reaction on quantum sources; the fundamental nature of "quantum jumps"; resonant transport of particles produced multiply in high-energy collisions; the multiple diffraction model of proton-proton and proton-antiproton scattering.

Awards and honors
Glauber received many honors for his research, including the Albert A. Michelson Medal from the Franklin Institute in Philadelphia (1985), the Max Born Award from the Optical Society of America (1985), the Dannie Heineman Prize for Mathematical Physics from the American Physical Society (1996), and the 2005 Nobel Prize in Physics. Professor Glauber was awarded the 'Medalla de Oro del CSIC' ('CSIC's Gold Medal') in a ceremony held in Madrid, Spain. He was elected a Foreign Member of the Royal Society (ForMemRS) in 1997.

After Glauber was selected for the Nobel Prize in Physics in 2005, a University of Texas at Austin Physics Professor, George Sudarshan, claimed that he had been overlooked by the Nobel Prize Committee for the award.  As was reported in Inside Higher Ed, the breakthrough publishing order between the two, that formed the basis for the field of Quantum Optics, was Glauber, Sudarshan, Glauber.  Apparently recognizing the involvement of others in work that led to its development, the Royal Swedish Academy of Sciences in their October 4th, 2005 press release, announcing Glauber as a Nobel Prize recipient, stated it was “for his contribution to the quantum theory of optical coherence”. Glauber, a theorist, was awarded half the prize, along with physics experimenters John Hall and Theodor Hänsch.

Ig Nobel
For many years before winning his Nobel Prize, Glauber was familiar to audiences of the Ig Nobel Prize ceremonies, where he took a bow each year as "Keeper of the Broom," sweeping the stage clean of the paper airplanes that have traditionally been thrown during the event.  He missed the 2005 event, though, as he was being awarded his real Nobel Prize for Physics.

Personal life
Glauber lived in Arlington, Massachusetts.

Glauber was a guest scientist at the European Organization for Nuclear Research (CERN) in 1967, during a sabbatical. In 1951, Glauber became a temporary lecturer at the California Institute of Technology, where he replaced Richard Feynman.

Glauber had a son and a daughter, and five grandchildren. He died on December 26, 2018, in Newton, Massachusetts.  His remains were laid to rest in Kensico Cemetery, Valhalla, NY.

Selected publications

Journal papers

Books

References

External links

2013 Video Interview with Roy Glauber by Cynthia C. Kelly Voices of the Manhattan Project
Audio Interview with Roy Glauber by Owen Gingerich Voices of the Manhattan Project
 Glauber States: Coherent states of Quantum Harmonic Oscillator
 Roy J. Glauber at the 2012 Harvard Physics Department Faculty website

1925 births
2018 deaths
Nobel laureates in Physics
American Nobel laureates
Jewish Nobel laureates
Members of the United States National Academy of Sciences
21st-century American physicists
The Bronx High School of Science alumni
Institute for Advanced Study visiting scholars
Foreign Members of the Royal Society
Harvard College alumni
Harvard University faculty
University of Arizona faculty
Manhattan Project people
Honorary members of Optica (society)
People from Arlington, Massachusetts
American people of German-Jewish descent
Jewish American physicists
Scientists from New York City
People associated with CERN
Fellows of the American Physical Society
Harvard Graduate School of Arts and Sciences alumni